Elizabeth Levy (born April 4, 1942) is an author who has written over eighty children's books in a variety of genres. Born in Buffalo, New York, she is currently living in New York City. She has appeared as a contestant on "Funny Or Die's Billy on the Street" on TruTV. She is a cousin of children's author Robie Harris.

Writing career
She has written a long-running series of mystery novels for youngsters under the Something Queer is Going On banner (Something Queer at the Library, Something Queer at the Haunted School, etc.). She is also responsible for the Horrible Histories spin-off series America's Funny But True History. Levy wrote several novelizations of the Star Wars episode Return of the Jedi.

Selected works
Something Queer is Going On, with Mordicai Gerstein (illustrator), (1973), Delacorte Press,  – first in the Something Queer series
The Computer That Said Steal Me (1983), Scholastic,  
Keep Ms. Sugarman in the Fourth Grade, with Dave Henderson (illustrator) (1992), HarperCollins,  
Cheater, Cheater, (1993), Scholastic,  
School Spirit Sabotage: A Brian and Pea Brain Mystery, George Ulrich (Illustrator), George M. Ulrich (Photographer), (1994), HarperCollins,  
My Life as a Fifth-Grade Comedian, (1997), HarperCollins,  
Seventh Grade Tango, (2000), Hyperion Books for Children,  
Who are you Calling a Woolly Mammoth?: Prehistoric America, Daniel McFeeley (illustrator), J.R. Havlan (additional material), (2000), Scholastic,  – first in the America's Funny But True History series
Danger & Diamonds: a mystery at sea, Mordicai Gerstein (illustrator), (2010), Roaring Brook Press,  
Paula Danziger's Amber Brown is Tickled Pink, Bruce Coville (co-author), Tony Ross (illustrator), Paula Danziger (inspiration), (2012), G. P. Putnam's Sons,  – a continuation of Danziger's Amber Brown series.

References

External links

  
 

American children's writers
1942 births
Jewish American writers
Living people
Writers from Buffalo, New York
American women children's writers
American women novelists
20th-century American novelists
20th-century American women writers
21st-century American novelists
21st-century American women writers
Novelists from New York (state)
21st-century American Jews